Eitan Reiter (born December 3, 1982) is an Israeli musician and producer. Eitan has released seven studio albums, one in his solo project under his own name, one album with Sebastian Mullaert, four studio albums as LOUD with Kobi Toledano, and one album as Unoccupied with Nadav Katz.

Music

Solo project
Reiter released his first solo album titled Places I miss that I haven’t been to through Aleph Zero Records, some of the tracks in this album were commercially successful, and were lated remixed by J.viewz Reiter remixed Balkan Beat Box song Look Them Act with Ori Rousso.

Collaboration with Sebastian Mullaert
Reiter's 2014 project was a collaboration with Sebastian Mullaert from minilogue. After working together for a while they released the album Reflection of Nothingness. They are working together on their next studio album.

LOUD
Reiter's main project is the electronic music band LOUD, together with record producer and sound engineer Kobi Toledano they have been producing original electronic music since 2006. They have released four studio albums together and as of 2015 were working on a fifth studio album, planned for release by Nano Records.

Collaboration with A. Balter
In 2010 Reiter and A. Balter collaborated on a psy-trance, techno and minimal music project.

Unoccupied
Reiter had access to a recording studio near his home town where he was producing his own music. He shared his studio time with audio engineer Nadav Katz as part of mixing the first three albums by LOUD. In 2008 they released the  Everyday Life album.

Mixing, sound production and engineering 
Reiter provided sound design, co-writing, co-arranging and mixing for Shayman, and was producer and sound engineer for Empirikal.

He also produced music for a short Israeli documentary film called Sea Sick, a short animated film by Liat Koren, and his single Ups & Downs, which was re-edited by Perfect Stranger, was in the soundtrack of the Brazilian drama film Artificial Paradises.

Discography

Studio albums
 Eitan Reiter – Places I Miss That I Haven't Been To, Style: Ambient, Downtempo, 2010. Aleph-Zero
 Eitan Reiter - Give it Life, Style: Electronic, Downtempo, 2017. Armadillo UK

Collaboration albums
 Eitan Reiter & Sebastian Mullaert – Reflections Of Nothingness, Style: Techno, 2014. Mule-Musiq
 LOUD [Eitan Reiter feat. Kobi Toledano] – No More X Style: Psy Trance, Electronica, 2012. Nano Records
 LOUD [Eitan Reiter feat. Kobi Toledano] – Free From Conceptual Thoughts, Style: Psy Trance, 2010. Drive Records
 LOUD [Eitan Reiter feat. Kobi Toledano] – Abstract, Style: Psy Trance, 2008. Drive Records
 LOUD [Eitan Reiter feat. Kobi Toledano] – Some Kind of Creativity, Style: Psy Trance, 2006. Drive Records
 Unoccupied [Eitan Reiter feat. Nadav Katz] – Everyday Life, Style: Electronica, 2007. Aleph-Zero

EPs/Compilations
 Eitan Retier – Ups & Downs
 Eitan Reiter & Perfect Stranger – Lizzard
 Eitan Reiter & A. Balter – iRich
 Eitan Reiter – Smile Dance Remixes
 Eitan Reiter & A. Balter – Vuvuzela
 Eitan Reiter & A. Balter – Komodo Dragon
 Eitan Reiter – Smile
 Eitan Reiter & A. Balter – Happy Fat Kids
 Eitan Reiter & A. Balter – Second Chance
 Eitan Reiter & Perfect Stranger – The Bite
 Eitan Reiter & A. Balter – EOE
 Eitan Reiter & A. Balter – Ups & Downs Remixes
 Eitan Reiter & Ido Ophit – Pipeline Music

References

External links
 Eitan Reiter Official Site

1982 births
Living people
Israeli electronic musicians
Israeli musicians
Israeli psychedelic trance musicians
Tracker musicians